Alfred Jackson Billes, CM (December 1, 1902 - April 3, 1995) was a Canadian businessman and co-founder of Canadian Tire.

Biography  
Born in Toronto, Ontario, at age sixteen, he went to work as a clerk at a branch of the Dominion Bank. In 1922, he used his savings to team up with his brother William to buy Hamilton Tire and Garage Ltd. in Toronto. The following year, the brothers moved the business to downtown Toronto where they began the conversion to a garage/retail business. In 1927, the brothers incorporated under the name Canadian Tire Corporation Ltd. and in 1934, Canadian Tire opened its first official associate store in Toronto, Ontario. The Billes brothers expanded into a full line of automotive products and home and garden supplies. They created owner/operated stores throughout the province of Ontario and into Quebec and the Maritime Provinces. Then, in 1966, they opened a store in Winnipeg, Manitoba and, by 1980, the most successful Canadian owned and operated franchise in the country's history had a nationwide network of dealer operated Canadian Tire Associate Stores.

On the unexpected death of his brother William in November 1956, Alfred Billes took over as President of Canadian Tire. He held the position for the next ten years and served as a director until 1988.  When he stepped down as the company's president and CEO, the Board of Directors named Dean Muncaster (b. 1934) as his replacement.
In 1976, Alfred Billes was made a Member of the Order of Canada and in recognition of his contribution to the Canadian economy, was voted into the Canadian Business Hall of Fame.

Alfred Billes married Marjorie Kitchen Baldry his second wife but sons Fred and David and a daughter Martha were by his first wife. He died in 1995 and was interred in the Mount Pleasant Cemetery, Toronto.

A publicly traded company on the Toronto Stock Exchange, Canadian Tire's Class A Non-Voting shares are widely held. However, the company has a dual share structure that gives voting control to the holders of a relatively small number of "Common" shares. Following the settlement of Alfred Billes' estate, in 1997, Martha Billes bought out her brothers and, through a substantial ownership of the "Common" shares, she has a controlling interest in the company.

In honour of Alfred Billes, the Canadian Tire Distribution Centre in Brampton, Ontario was named after him as the A.J. Billes Centre.

References and further reading
Brown, Ian. Freewheeling. 1989. Toronto: Harper & Collins
McBride, Hugh. Our Store: 75 Years of Canadians and Canadian Tire. 1997. Quantum Book Group. .

1902 births
1995 deaths
Businesspeople from Toronto
Canadian Tire
Members of the Order of Canada
Burials at Mount Pleasant Cemetery, Toronto